Kunduana is one of the highest ranked clans (or Gotras) among Gujjars.They are found in Pakistan and Northern India (Kashmir).

Geographical distribution

India
In India, Kunduanas reside mainly in the states of Punjab (India) and Kashmir. In Punjab, 5 villages have only Kunduanas. They are also found in tehsils of Srinagar.

Pakistan
In Pakistan, Kunduana / Kunduwana Clans are found in Gujrat, Gujranwala, Lahore, Faisalabad, Chakwal, Sialkot, Sahiwal, Sargodha, Hafizabad, Narowal, Bahawalpur Multan and Bahawalnagar, Sheikhupura districts of Punjab (Pakistan).

Religion 

The majority of Kunduanas are Muslim. The Muslim population of Kunduana lives predominantly in Pakistan.

History 

The Kunduanas are one of the oldest Gujjar clans in South West Asia. Although they are included amongst the larger Gujjar gotra.

Gurjar clans